Arthur Beebe Chapin (November 17, 1868 – March 20, 1943) was an American politician who served as the Treasurer and Receiver-General of Massachusetts from 1905 to 1909.

Chapin was born on November 17, 1868, in Chicopee, Massachusetts. He attended Phillips Andover Academy and graduated from Amherst College in 1891. He spent two years as a writer for The Youth's Companion. He was admitted to the Hampden County bar in 1895 after studying law under his father, Judge Henry Chapin.

Chapin was hired as the Solicitor of Holyoke, Massachusetts, in 1896 and two years later he was elected Mayor of the city. He was elected Treasurer and Receiver-General of Massachusetts in 1904, an office he held until April 1, 1909, when he resigned to become State Bank Commissioner. He resigned as bank commissioner on January 15, 1912, in order to become a vice-president of the American Trust Company.

Chapin died on March 20, 1943, in Holyoke, Massachusetts.

References

1868 births
1943 deaths
Amherst College alumni
Mayors of Holyoke, Massachusetts
State treasurers of Massachusetts
Massachusetts Republicans
Phillips Academy alumni
Massachusetts lawyers
People from Chicopee, Massachusetts